"I Wish I Could Shimmy Like My Sister Kate", often simply "Sister Kate", is an up-tempo jazz dance song, written by Armand J. Piron and published in 1922.

Louis Armstrong claimed he had written the song and sold it for 10$ he never received. Kate was a murdered brothel madame named Katie Townsend. Kid Ory recorded it with original Armstrong lyrics in Denmark  Nov 13th 1959, but never used this lyrics in the USA.
Early recordings listed at Discogs  include 1922 sides by Mary Straine And Joseph Smith's Jazz Band on Black Swan Records; The Virginians on Victor; and The Original Memphis Five, as an instrumental, on Pathé Actuelle. Vocalist Anna Jones recorded it accompanied by Fats Waller on piano in 1923. Arrangements ranged from big band jazz to the Alabama Jug Band in the 1930s, a precursor to jug band revival versions during the 1960s' by Dave Van Ronk and Jim Kweskin (see below).
The lyrics of the song are narrated first person by Kate's sister, who sings about Kate's impressive dancing skill and her wish to be able to emulate it. She laments that she's not quite "up to date", but believes that dancing the Shimmy like "Sister Kate" will rectify this, and she will be able to impress "all the boys in the neighborhood" like her sister.

Over the years this song has been performed and recorded by many artists, including Frances Faye and Rusty Warren, a 1959 version by Shel Silverstein, The Olympics in 1960 (released as "Shimmy Like Kate"), the Red Onion Band, and a beat version by The Remo Four in 1964. It was performed live by The Beatles in 1962, and a recording of one such performance appears on Live! at the Star-Club in Hamburg, Germany; 1962. The song arrived in the 1960s and 1970s folk scene thanks to Dave Van Ronk (recording it twice on In the Tradition and on Dave Van Ronk and the Ragtime Jug Stompers) and Jim Kweskin, who made it part of a "Sister Kate's Night Out" medley on his Relax Your Mind album with Mel Lyman and Fritz Richmond. In 1967, the Nitty Gritty Dirt Band included it in on their eponymous The Nitty Gritty Dirt Band (album).

The song was performed by Jayne Mansfield in the 1956 film The Girl Can't Help It

The song was featured in an episode of the Carol Burnett Show (Episode 7.6) in 1973.
 
David Bowie used to team this song with an updated version of the Flares 1960 doo-wop song "Foot Stompin'" during the Diamond Dogs Tour, as heard on the compilation Rarestonebowie. Guitarist Carlos Alomar blessed the update with a riff that became Bowie's hit "Fame", cowritten with John Lennon.

Judith Durham recorded a version for her album, Judith Durham and The Hottest Band in Town (1974).

The song was also featured in an episode of All in the Family during the show's final (1978) season, in which Edith and Stephanie plan to sing the song for a talent show at Stephanie's school.

Ragtime revival band The Blue Rags put a version on their 1997 album ”Rag-N-Roll". On their self-titled 2004 debut album, the Ditty Bops also covered the song as did The Livin' Blues, a 60s Dutch blues band.

A rare video footage of the song with Cécile McLorin Salvant from 2014 brought life to the song on the internet amongst the young jazz-generation.

A version of the song can be heard in the background of the season 4 finale of Boardwalk Empire

A passage from the song is used in the poem Interview, written by Vijay Seshadri.

A version of the song is performed in The Good Old Days episode of The Danny Thomas Show. Season 5 Episode 25.

On their debut album, The Ditty Bops recorded the song with traditional arrangements using vintage instruments.

References

External links
"Sister Kate" lyrics

Jazz songs
1919 songs
American jazz songs
Songs written by Clarence Williams (musician)
Jim Croce songs
Songs about dancing
The Olympics (band) songs